Las Vicuñas National Reserve is a nature reserve located in the Parinacota Province, Arica y Parinacota Region, Chile. The reserve lies immediately south of Lauca National Park and in its southern portion is contiguous to Salar de Surire Natural Monument, all of which form Lauca Biosphere Reserve. The major elevations are Arintika and Pukintika.

This Puna ecosystem preserves high-altitude wildlife, including Vicuñas, for which the reserve is named.

Much of the reserve consists of extensive Andean steppes cut by rivers and quebradas, being Lauca River the main one. Typical vegetation includes pajonal, tolar and llaretal formations. In some areas is possible to find specimen of Polylepis tarapacana.

References
 Reserva Nacional Las Vicuñas

National reserves of Chile
Protected areas of Arica y Parinacota Region